Ninenzaka, or Ninen-zaka, is an ancient 150m stone-paved pedestrian road  and tourist attraction in Higashiyama-ku, Kyoto, Japan. The road is lined with traditional buildings and shops, and is often paired with the similar road, Sannenzaka.

There is a Starbucks coffeehouse in a two-storey, century-old Japanese townhouse along Ninenzaka.

References

External links
 

Streets in Kyoto
Tourist attractions in Kyoto